Sir John William David Swan  (born 3 July 1935) is a former Bermudian political figure.  A real estate developer, a political luminary and a philanthropist, Swan served as Premier of Bermuda from 1982 to 1995.

Swan built his reputation through property development.

Elected to Parliament in 1972, the former Premier established the island as a major offshore financial center, and under Swan's stewardship the Government completed in excess of 20 major projects.
 
In 1985 Swan led the negotiations and the completion of the Tax Treaty with the United States. The agreement resulted in the development of the insurance and reinsurance industries. The Bermuda delegation held several meetings with the most senior officials in the U.S. Government including the President, Vice-President, Secretary of the Treasury, Secretary of State and National Security Advisor in order to successfully implement a tax treaty between Bermuda and the United States.  These initiatives created a foundation for the island's stable economy, well-developed infrastructure and regulatory framework.
 
Swan favoured independence of Bermuda from Britain, however following a referendum in 1995 that overwhelmingly rejected the proposal, he resigned as Premier. Swan voted against the Stubbs Bill decriminalising homosexuality in Bermuda. The Bill passed however without Swan's support.

In addition to serving as the Premier, Swan was the Minister of Immigration and Labour from 1976 to 1982, the Minister of Marine and Air Services from 1975 to 1976, and Chairman of Bermuda Hospitals Board. He was also a founding member of the Bermuda Monetary Authority, Director of the Bermuda Chamber of Commerce and a Director of the Bermuda Employers Council.
 
Swan transformed international trade, politics, and property development in Bermuda. In 1990 he was appointed by Her Majesty the Queen a Knight Commander of the Order of the British Empire (KBE). In 1986 Swan was awarded the Medal of Distinction in recognition of his humanitarian endeavours from the International Association of Lions Clubs. Swan received the International Medal of Excellence from the Poor Richard Club of Philadelphia, the oldest press and advertising club in Philadelphia. He was admitted as a Senator to the Membership and Fellowship of the Senate of the Junior Chamber of Commerce.  In 2002 Swan was awarded the St. Paul's A.M.E. Outstanding Service Award.

A legislative bill was drafted to prevent Swan from establishing McDonald's restaurants on Bermuda. Ann Cartwright DeCouto, Swan's former Deputy Premier, introduced the Prohibited Restaurants Act to Parliament to stop the proposed McDonald's. The House voted in favor of the ban in 1996, but the appointed Senate rejected the ban. Swan intended to challenge the legality of the law in Bermuda's Supreme Court. Then-Premier David Saul, who approved Swan's intentions in December 1995, resigned in March 1997 after a controversy over his decision and Swan's plans.

Swan serves as chairman of the Swan Group of Companies.  He holds a Bachelor of Arts degree from West Virginia Wesleyan College. In addition, he has been awarded a B.A. Honorary Fellowship at Bermuda College, honorary doctorate from West Virginia Wesleyan College, an honorary doctorate of law from Atlantic Union College, and an honorary doctorate, humane letters from Morris Brown College in Atlanta, Georgia.

References

External links

1935 births
Living people
Knights Commander of the Order of the British Empire
United Bermuda Party politicians
Immigration ministers of Bermuda
Labour ministers of Bermuda
Premiers of Bermuda
West Virginia Wesleyan College alumni